RiverTown Crossings is a two-story enclosed super-regional shopping mall in Grandville, Michigan. It has four anchors: Macy's, Kohl's, JCPenney, and Dick's Sporting Goods with two vacant anchors last occupied by Younkers and Sears.

History

Design and development
The area occupied by the mall was initially the site for Shoemaker Airfield, which was constructed in the 1960s. Plans for a commercial development in Grandville began in 1981 when developer General Growth Properties purchased 99 acres of land on what is now Rivertown Parkway. In 1990, Homart Development Company, a subsidiary of Sears, had begun eyeing a development of a new mall near the intersection of 44th Street and Ivanrest and met with the city for approval. In November 1990, Homart Development Co. originally proposed a 1 million square foot, 120-store indoor mall on 94 acres of land near the intersection, seeking for the land to be rezoned from high-tech industrial to commercial. However, the City of Grandville turned down the plans in January 1991, stating that a 99-acre lot on Rivertown Parkway, which was adjacent to the property sought by Homart, was already zoned for commercial usage and was owned by General Growth. Homart's plan for a mall was then put on hold after its director, Roy Vice, left the company and Homart Development Company was put up for sale in 1994, later being sold to General Growth in 1995.

In October 1994 after waiting for the economy to strengthen, General Growth vice president John Bergstrom proposed a 150-store mall with 4 anchor stores, stating that the project could be completed by Spring 1997. This plan was also declined on October 12, 1994, with Grandville Mayor James Buck stating that more commercial was not needed in the city. General Growth then made a deal to acquire more land adjacent to the site in August 1996, with a new proposed mall site totaling 138 acres.

General Growth and the City of Grandville then made a deal in October 1996 after General Growth promised in August that the mall would only remain in Grandville and not span into Wyoming, with Grandville Mayor James Buck stating, "The construction of this mall has been anticipated for years. ... Our goal will be to provide the finest shopping mall in Michigan". A revised plan for the mall was later approved in May 1997 which reduced the size of the mall to just over 130 stores.

Opening
RiverTown Crossings opened on November 3, 1999 just prior to the holiday season with five original anchors: Sears, Hudson's (became Marshall Field's in 2001, Macy's in 2006), Kohl's, Younkers and JCPenney with Barnes & Noble also featured as a junior anchor. Months later, Galyan's (now Dick's Sporting Goods) and Old Navy opened, with Galyan's becoming the mall's sixth anchor tenant and Old Navy becoming another junior anchor. The mall also offered a Cinemark cinema with 20 screens near its food court. A NASCAR Silicon Motor Speedway Racing Center and Kahunaville were present at the mall shortly after its opening, with both closing a few years later.

The mall was one of the first developments in the area. After the mall was built, many other restaurants and stores opened around it. Now the area is well developed and a major shopping district for the West Side of Grand Rapids including the Holland Area.

Further changes
On March 26, 2002, Meijer opened outside the mall. Duluth Trading Company opened in the mall's property on November 16, 2017.

On April 18, 2018, it was announced that Younkers would be closing its doors due to its parent company, The Bon-Ton Stores, was unable to find a buyer forcing the chain to go out of business. The store closed on August 29, 2018. On November 9, 2020, it was announced that Sears would also be closing as part of a plan to close 7 stores nationwide. The store closed on January 24, 2021.

Stores and attractions
Outside are more than 6,000 parking spaces.

Food and beverage merchants are located in the mall.  There is also a food court with a carousel in the center that is surrounded by 8 quick service restaurants.

The mall features murals painted by Chicago-based artist Thomas Melvin in 1999, when the mall first opened. As part of a minor renovation in 2017, many of these murals were painted over, with only those above the anchor stores remaining.

Near the food court, there is also a 20 screen Celebration Cinema movie theater. The theater serves as one of the mall's anchor tenants and is one of the most popular cinemas in Michigan, consecutively performing as one of the top 3 theaters in the state.

References

External links
The Rapid Route 8 schedule
The Rapid Route 44 schedule

Shopping malls in Michigan
Brookfield Properties
Buildings and structures in Kent County, Michigan
Shopping malls established in 1999
Tourist attractions in Kent County, Michigan
1999 establishments in Michigan